The 2016 Novak Djokovic tennis season officially commenced on 4 January with the start of the Qatar ExxonMobil Open.

Yearly summary

Australian Open

The reigning champion entered the 2016 Australian Open as the top seed. Djokovic started his title defence against Korean Chung Hyeon, defeating the 19-year-old in straight sets (10th consecutive win in first-round Australian Open without dropping a set). Into third round after third-set fightback defeated French teen Quentin Halys. Win in the fourth round of the Italian Andreas Seppi has become the 33rd in a row against Italian opposition (only defeat in his first meeting with an Italian player at 2004 Umag to Filippo Volandri). In his 60th match at the Australian Open, despite 100 unforced errors (new own record, previous value – 75) in five sets, Djokovic into 27th straight Grand Slam quarterfinal, surviving Gilles Simon in four hours, 32 minutes. He then defeated Kei Nishikori in straight sets to reach his sixth Australian Open semifinal.

Djokovic then defeated former champion Roger Federer in four sets, winning the first two sets in 54 minutes combined, to reach his sixth Australian Open final (new record of the Open Era) and 19th Grand slam final (the joint-third highest number of slam finals in the history of tennis). This marks the 17th (5th at a Major) straight tournament final that Djokovic has reached since last January. The victory also gave Djokovic the edge in his head-to-head record against Federer for the first time at 23–22 (he also leads each of the other three members of the Big Four in the head-to-head as well).

In the final, Djokovic captured his sixth Australian Open title by defeating No. 2 Andy Murray in straight sets in just under three hours (57th match-win at the Australian Open and take sole ownership of 2nd place on the list for most Australian Open match-wins in the Open Era) to win his eleventh major title (3rd consecutive win Grand Slam), placing him in equal fifth place on the all-time list with Björn Borg and Rod Laver. His sixth title in Melbourne equals Roy Emerson's record. He also won his seventh (2015 US Open, 2015 Beijing, 2015 Shanghai, 2015 Paris, the 2015 ATP World Tour Finals, 2016 Doha and 2016 Australian Open) consecutive Tour-level title.

French Open

Djokovic began 16th Grand Slam tournament as the No. 1 seed. It's also the fourth time in five years at Roland Garros and the eighth consecutive Grand Slam (the 21st consecutive Majors in a Top 2 seed) in which Djokovic has been the top seed. He reached 200 weeks at No. 1 in the ATP rankings (May 23) and also achieved 100 consecutive weeks at No. 1 (May 30) during the tournament.

Djokovic won his first French Open title to complete a career Grand Slam. The Serb defeated Lu Yen-hsun of Chinese Taipei in one hour and 30 minutes to stretch his undefeated streak to 12–0 in first-round play in Paris. Djokovic defeated the Belgian Steve Darcis in 2 hours and 19 minutes to reach the third round of the French Open and earn his 50th win at Roland Garros, becoming just the third player in the Open Era after Roger Federer and Serena Williams to record 50 wins at each of the four Grand Slams. The World No. 1 defeated Britain's Aljaž Bedene in straight sets after just over two hours, in what was more of a fight against time to speed into the last 16. Some days trailing by a set in damp stop-start conditions Djokovic defeated Roberto Bautista Agut in three hours and 16 minutes to reach his 28th successive Grand Slam championship quarter-final. Djokovic progressed to his 30th Grand Slam (6th straight Roland Garros) semi-final with a win over Czech Tomáš Berdych following a controversial rain delay. For the second straight year, a quarter-final victory at Roland Garros guaranteed the 29-year-old Serbian his place in the ATP World Tour Finals and at the same time became the first player in tennis history to earn more than US$100 million in prize money over his 14-season pro career. Djokovic advanced to his fourth Roland Garros final by dispatching Dominic Thiem in one hour and 48 minutes, putting him into his sixth consecutive and 20th overall Grand Slam final. In the final, Djokovic defeated Murray 3–6, 6–1, 6–2, 6–4. With his first French Open title, Djokovic completed the career Grand Slam and became only the third man to hold all four major titles simultaneously and the first since Laver won all four in 1969. Djokovic also became the only man ever to hold all four majors on three different surfaces at the same time (at the time of the previous achievements, the Australian and US Opens were played on grass).

Wimbledon 
Djokovic began his 2016 Wimbledon quest as the two-time defending champion and top seed, and overwhelming favourite. He defeated James Ward and Adrian Mannarino, in straight sets. In the third round, he lost to No. 28 seed Sam Querrey from the United States, ending his grand slam winning streak at 30 matches.  The match was played across two days due to numerous rain delays on a then-roofless No. 1 Court. This was Djokovic's first loss in a grand slam before the quarterfinal since the 2009 French Open, and his earliest at Wimbledon since 2008.

US Open 
Djokovic entered the US Open as the defending champion and top seed. After a tough four set victory in the first round, second round walkover and a brief third round match. Djokovic beat Kyle Edmund in straight sets. He defeated Gaël Monfils in the semi-finals in four sets, but in the final, lost to Stan Wawrinka in four sets.

ATP World Tour Finals 
Djokovic was the first player to qualify for the ATP World Tour Finals after reaching the Roland Garros semi-finals (June 2, 2016). Five-time champion (2008, 2012–15) will make 10th appearance (2007–16). After a tough three set victory against Dominic Thiem and a close two set tiebreak against Milos Raonic, Djokovic defeated David Goffin and Kei Nishikori in the round robin stage and semi-finals respectively, both in straight sets. He lost to Andy Murray in the final in straight sets, ending his 2016 season

Other tournaments 
Djokovic for the second consecutive year began the season with a tournament in Doha, Qatar.

Qatar Open
Djokovic reached the final without losing a set. Novak Djokovic notches first Doha crown, defeating Rafael Nadal in the final in a 73-minute match. This marked his 16th straight final (3rd in Open Era) – and 12th title – since he lost in the Qatar Open quarterfinals last year (l. to Karlović). The world No. 1 capturing his sixth consecutive ATP World Tour title and 60th overall at the tour-level. He became just the 10th player in the Open Era to reach the 60-title milestone. The Djokovic leads the historic Head2Head against Nadal for the first time at 24–23. He has now claimed 11 consecutive sets since Nadal prevailed in the 2014 Roland Garros final.  Djokovic (d. Verdasco, 2R and Nadal, F) to reach 18th win in a row vs Spaniards (last loss to Robredo at 2014 Cincinnati, 3R) & 20th straight win vs left-handers (last loss to Nadal at 2014 Roland Garros, F). Also Novak has updated its own record for highest number of points accrued in the ATP rankings – 16,790.

Dubai Tennis Championships
Four-time tournament champion opened his 10th consecutive Dubai Tennis Championships campaign with convincing win over Tommy Robredo, beating Spaniard in just 66 minutes. Novak Djokovic joined the 700-win club defeating Malek Jaziri in second round in 65 minutes to reach the quarterfinals. He is only the 12th player in the Open Era (since 1968) to hit the 700 singles victories mark, next his coach, Boris Becker (713). In the 479 days since the world No. 1 claimed his 600th match win on 2 November 2014, he has compiled an astonishing 100–6 record. At 28 years, nine months, he is the third active player to pass the milestone, following in the footsteps of his celebrated rivals, Roger Federer (1,067) and Rafael Nadal (775). Djokovic's streak of ATP World Tour finals reached will end at 17 after the world No. 1 retired against Feliciano López in the quarter-finals. Top seed was forced to retire with an eye ailment. The Serb was down 3–6 before retiring, last time Novak retired was 2011 Davis Cup against Juan Martín del Potro, a stretch of 350 matches (318–32).

Davis Cup World Group
In R1 Djokovic beat Aleksandr Nedovyesov in straight sets in an hour and 53 minutes (1–0). Kazakhstan took a shock 2–1 lead against Serbia in their Davis Cup by BNP Paribas first round tie after Aleksandr Nedovyesov and Andrey Golubev beat former doubles No. 1 Nenad Zimonjić and Novak Djokovic in doubles. Djokovic prevailed in five-hour match against Kazakhstan's Mikhail Kukushkin in five sets and equalized (2–2). Former Davis Cup by BNP Paribas winners Serbia set up a blockbuster quarterfinal tie with holders Great Britain after edging Kazakhstan 3–2 in a titanic tussle.

Indian Wells Masters
Djokovic started tournament with a tough match against the American Bjorn Fratangelo. The Serb rallied back from a set down to win in three sets. In the next round Novak Djokovic beat Philipp Kohlschreiber in straight sets. The four-time Indian Wells Masters champion is successfully continuing his title-defending journey with a win over Feliciano López in the fourth round, in an hour and 7 minutes. In the quarterfinals Djokovic overcame Jo-Wilfried Tsonga in 2 hours and 6 minutes to set up a blockbuster semifinal at the Indian Wells Tennis Garden. Djokovic continued his winning streak against Rafael Nadal beating him in straight sets to reach the 6th 2016 BNP Paribas Open final for the third straight year in a row. He has now beaten the Spaniard six times in a row, with his last loss coming in the 2014 French Open final. Djokovic has now lifted his record over Nadal to 25–23 (only 2nd (first Boris Becker) man in Open Era to beat one rival 25 times). He has reached 10 straight ATP Masters 1000 finals (DNP 2015 Mutua Madrid Open) since 2014 BNP Paribas Masters, winning 8 titles (50–2 record). In the final Novak Djokovic destroyed Milos Raonic during the 77-minute match, to win his third straight and a record fifth Indian Wells Masters title. Djokovic commits four total unforced errors, rolls to most overwhelming win in ATP Masters 1000 final ever. He now has a 17-match win streak at Indian Wells Masters with the three-peat. His record in the desert is 47–6. The world No. 1 improves his record on the year to 22–1. This marks Djokovic's 27th ATP Masters 1000 crown. He is now tied with Rafael Nadal for the all-time lead. Djokovic is first man to win 20 ATP Masters 1000 (or equivalent) titles on one surface (hard courts). Rafael Nadal has 19 on clay.

Djokovic has more ATP points that Andy Murray No. 2 and Roger Federer No. 3 combined.

Miami Open
Djokovic began the tournament with a first round bye, and then faced Kyle Edmund in the 2nd Round. Djokovic won easily in two sets. In the third round, Djokovic faced João Sousa. Djokovic again won in two sets. In the fourth round, Djokovic faced up and coming youngster Dominic Thiem. Thiem had already won two titles this year. Djokovic won in two sets. After reaching the fourth round, Djokovic went head to head against Tomáš Berdych. Unsurprisingly, Djokovic won in straight sets. Djokovic faced David Goffin of Belgium. Despite a spirited performance, Djokovic prevailed. In the final, Djokovic faced and beat Kei Nishikori. This was Djokovic's fourth title of the year. It improved his yearly record to 28–1. His one loss was a retirement.  This was also the third straight year he won the Sunshine Double, and fourth overall (2011, 2014, 2015, 2016).

Monte-Carlo Masters
Djokovic began the tournament as the heavy favourite, but was knocked out by Jiří Veselý in the second round. This was his earliest exit in a Masters event in nearly three years, when he was knocked out by Grigor Dimitrov at the 2013 Mutua Madrid Open.

Madrid Open
Djokovic received a first round bye. In the second round, he beat up and coming youngster Borna Ćorić in straight sets to set up a meeting with Roberto Bautista Agut. Djokovic won in straight sets. Djokovic then had wins against Milos Raonic and Kei Nishikori to make it to the finals. Djokovic would lock horns with Andy Murray for a 33rd time. Djokovic defeated Murray in three sets in a very entertaining match which saw Djokovic save 7 break points in the final game to clinch victory. This victory also set a new record for most Masters 1000 titles with 29.

Italian Open
Novak Djokovic received a bye in the first round. Djokovic beat qualifier Stéphane Robert and Thomaz Bellucci. He then faced Rafael Nadal for a record 49th time and won in two tight sets. After downing Kei Nishikori in three sets, he faced Andy Murray in the final. It was a disappointment with Murray winning in two sets. This was the 2nd time out of the last 14 matches Murray had beaten Djokovic.

Rogers Cup
After receiving a bye in the first round, Djokovic started his campaign against Gilles Müller, defeating him in two tight sets. He then faced qualifier Radek Štěpánek in the third round and fifth seed Tomáš Berdych in the quarterfinals, winning both matches in straight sets. In the semifinals, he faced the resurgent Gaël Monfils, defeating him for the 12th time in his career. In the final, he faced 3rd seed Kei Nishikori, defeating him for the 5th time this season with a score of 6−3, 7−5. This was Djokovic's 7th title of the season. It was also his 30th Masters 1000 Series title and 43rd Masters final, breaking away from Roger Federer and Rafael Nadal, who are both on 42 finals.

Summer Olympics
Hoping to win a gold medal for the first time in his career, Djokovic entered the 2016 Summer Olympics, but lost to Juan Martín del Potro in straight sets. In the doubles he lost in the second round.

Shanghai Masters
Djokovic received a bye in the first round, Djokovic defeated Fabio Fognini and Vasek Pospisil in straight sets. He defeated Mischa Zverev in three sets, but lost to Roberto Bautista Agut in straight sets.

Paris Masters
Djokovic received a bye in the first round. He defeated Gilles Müller in straight sets, defeated Grigor Dimitrov in three sets before losing to Marin Čilić in straight sets

All matches
This table lists all the matches of Djokovic this year, including walkovers W/O (they are marked ND for non-decision)

Singles Matches

Doubles matches

Exhibition matches

Tournament schedule

Singles schedule

Doubles schedule

Yearly records

Head-to-head matchups
Novak Djokovic has a  record against the top 10,  against the top 11–50,  against other players;  against right-handed players and  against left-handed players.
Ordered by number of wins (Bolded number marks a top 10 player at the time of first match of the year, Italic means top 50; "L" means left-handed player).
{{columns-list|colwidth=22em|
  Kei Nishikori                         
  Tomáš Berdych                         
  Rafael Nadal       
  Milos Raonic                            
  Dominic Thiem                           
  Andy Murray                           
  Jo-Wilfried Tsonga                    
  Gaël Monfils                            
  Kyle Edmund                                 
  David Goffin                            
  Roberto Bautista Agut                   
  Roger Federer                         
  Tommy Robredo                           
  Gilles Simon                            
  Fernando Verdasco (L)    
  Philipp Kohlschreiber                   
  Andreas Seppi                           
  Thomaz Bellucci (L)      
  Leonardo Mayer                          
  João Sousa                              
  Borna Ćorić                             
  Gilles Müller (L)        
  Fabio Fognini                           
  Lu Yen-hsun                                 
  Steve Darcis                                
  Aljaž Bedene                                
  Mikhail Kukushkin                           
  Chung Hyeon                                 
  Stéphane Robert                             
  Malek Jaziri                                
  Aleksandr Nedovyesov                        
  Adrian Mannarino (L)         
  Dustin Brown          
  James Ward              
  Bjorn Fratangelo                            
  Quentin Halys                               
  Radek Štěpánek                              
  Jerzy Janowicz                              
  Mikhail Youzhny                             
  Vasek Pospisil                              
  Mischa Zverev (L)            
  Feliciano López (L)      
  Stan Wawrinka                         
  Sam Querrey                             
  Jiří Veselý (L)              
  Juan Martín del Potro                       
  Marin Čilić                       
}}

Finals

Singles: 10 (7 titles, 3 runner-ups)

EarningsBold''' font denotes tournament win

source：
source：

Awards and nominations
 Laureus World Sports Award for Sportsman of the Year
 Marca Leyenda

See also
 2016 ATP World Tour
 2016 Roger Federer tennis season
 2016 Rafael Nadal tennis season
 2016 Andy Murray tennis season
 2016 Stan Wawrinka tennis season

References

External links
  
 ATP tour profile

Novak Djokovic tennis seasons
Djokovic
2016 in Serbian sport
Tennis players at the 2016 Summer Olympics